USS Adams may refer to:

 , was a 28-gun frigate launched in 1799 and active in the War of 1812 and scuttled to prevent capture in 1814.
 , was a wooden screw steamer commissioned in 1876 and decommissioned in 1919
 , was a destroyer minelayer serving at the end of World War II.
  a guided missile destroyer that served during the Cold War.

See also
 The 200-ton brig Adams was purchased during the summer of 1812 but captured by the British and renamed HMS Detroit. The Americans briefly recaptured her but had to abandon her when she grounded; she was then burnt
 

United States Navy ship names